Mansur Ahmad Saad al-Dayfi is a citizen of Yemen who was held, without charge, in the United States Guantanamo Bay detention camps, in Cuba, from February 9, 2002, to July 11, 2016. He has stated that Florida governor Ron DeSantis  oversaw beatings and force-feedings of detainees at Gauntanamo. On July 11, 2016, he and a Tajikistani captive were transferred to Serbia.

His Guantanamo Internment Serial Number is 441. JTF-GTMO analysts estimate he was born in 1979, in Sanaa, Yemen.

Official status reviews

Originally the Bush Presidency asserted that captives apprehended in the "war on terror" were not covered by the Geneva Conventions, and could be held indefinitely, without charge, and without an open and transparent review of the justifications for their detention.
In 2004, the United States Supreme Court ruled, in Rasul v. Bush, that Guantanamo captives were entitled to being informed of the allegations justifying their detention, and were entitled to try to refute them.

Office for the Administrative Review of Detained Enemy Combatants

Following the Supreme Court's ruling the Department of Defense set up the Office for the Administrative Review of Detained Enemy Combatants.

Scholars at the Brookings Institution, led by Benjamin Wittes, listed the captives still held in Guantanamo in December 2008, according to whether their detention was justified by certain common allegations:

Formerly secret Joint Task Force Guantanamo assessment

Al-Dayfi's thirteen-page Joint Task Force Guantanamo assessment was drafted on June 9, 2008. It was signed by camp commandant Rear Admiral David M. Thomas Jr., who recommended continued detention.

Transfer to Serbia

Al-Dayfi was transferred to Serbia, which al-Dayfi describes as "Guantanamo 2.0". He was transferred together with an individual from Tajikistan named "Muhammadi Davlatov".

PBS Frontline profile

On February 21, 2017, al-Dayfi was profiled in an episode of the PBS network's Frontline series.  His habeas attorney, Beth Jacob, described how al-Dayfi was offered either Serbia or continued detention.

Jacob said that neither Serbia nor the US had provided him with any language training, or other support to help him adapt to civilian life, or adjust to living in a foreign culture, or help him find employment, and that he had started a hunger strike in consequence.

Al-Dayfi learned English in Guantanamo.

When Frontline visited al-Dayfi, his weight had dropped 18 pounds in 21 days.  In Guantanamo, he had been continuously force-fed for over two years.

Frontline producers were intercepted by security officials.

During the course of their research al-Dayfi disappeared.  Serbian security officials interfered with their access to him.

Art from Guantanamo

On September 15, 2017, the New York Times published an account al-Dayfi had written of how desperate the Guantanamo captives were to see the sea, and how an approaching hurricane, in 2014, finally gave them a view.  The fences surrounding the camp had opaque screens hung from them.  The screens were removed when the hurricane approached, to prevent the fences being blown away.

In 2021 he published Don't Forget Us Here: Lost and Found at Guantanamo, a memoir written in collaboration with Antonio Aiello and based on manuscripts he wrote while detained.

Open letter to President Biden

On January 29, 2021 the New York Review of Books published an open letter from al Dayfi, and six other individuals who were formerly held in Guantanamo, to newly inaugurated President Biden, appealing to him to close the detention camp.

Allegations regarding Ron DeSantis 
In a November 2022 interview by al-Dayfi, al-Dayfi stated that during his time as a JAG lawyer at Guantanamo Bay detention camp, current Florida governor Ron DeSantis oversaw beatings and force-feedings of detainees.

References

External links

 Who Are the Remaining Prisoners in Guantánamo? Part Two: Captured in Afghanistan (2001) Andy Worthington, September 17, 2010

1979 births
Living people
Detainees of the Guantanamo Bay detention camp
Yemeni extrajudicial prisoners of the United States
People from Sanaa